The Women's individual pursuit competition at the 2018 UCI Track Cycling World Championships was held on 3 March 2018.

Results

Qualifying
The first two racers race for gold, the third and fourth fastest rider race for the bronze medal.

Finals
The finals were held at 20:25.

References

Women's individual pursuit
UCI Track Cycling World Championships – Women's individual pursuit